Stanisław Wojciech Zagaja (11 May 1925 in Szczurowa, Poland – 17 December 2004 in Skierniewice, Poland) was a Polish pomologist, grower of orchard plants. Professor (since 1963) and director (since 1984) of the Research Institute of Pomology and Floriculture in Skierniewice, member of Polish Academy of Sciences since 1983.

His research was focused on fruit tree breeding, selection and seed physiology as well as working with apple vegetative rootstocks, and hybrids of peach and cherry.

Books

References

1925 births
2004 deaths
Polish biologists
Members of the Polish Academy of Sciences
20th-century biologists